Donald Charles Savelkoul (July 29, 1917 – May 24, 2004) was an American lawyer, politician, and businessman.

Biography
Savelkoul was born in Minneapolis, Minnesota. He graduated from University of Minnesota in 1939 and then worked in the United States Department of Labor, Wage and Hour Division until 1943. Savelkoul served in the United States Army Signal Corps from 1943 to 1946 and was stationed in the Pacific; he was commissioned a first lieutenant. In 1951, Savelkoul received his law degree from William Mitchell College of Law. Savelkoul lived in Fridley, Minnesota with his wife and family. He served as general counsel for the Minnesota AFL–CIO unit. Savelkoul served in the Minnesota House of Representatives in 1967 and 1968. Savelkoul died from cancer at his home in Fridley, Minnesota.

Notes

External links

1917 births
2004 deaths
People from Fridley, Minnesota
Businesspeople from Minneapolis
Lawyers from Minneapolis
Military personnel from Minneapolis
University of Minnesota alumni
William Mitchell College of Law alumni
United States Department of Labor officials
AFL–CIO people
Members of the Minnesota House of Representatives
Deaths from cancer in Minnesota
20th-century American politicians
20th-century American businesspeople
20th-century American lawyers